Wojciech Skaba (born 9 April 1984) is a Polish former professional footballer who played as a goalkeeper and former youth gymnastics champion.

Career
After a successful 2006–07 season at Odra, he signed a contract with Legia Warsaw after Łukasz Fabiański was sold to Arsenal. He spent two seasons as the club's second-choice keeper, making only two league appearances. In July 2009, he joined Polonia Bytom on a one-year loan. He returned to Legia in the summer of 2010.

In 2014, he moved to Ruch Chorzów and played seven games in Ekstraklasa.

On 27 March 2017, he signed a contract with Zagłębie Sosnowiec.

Honours
Legia Warsaw
 Ekstraklasa: 2013–14
 Polish Cup: 2007–08, 2010–11, 2011–12, 2012–13

References

External links
 

1984 births
Living people
People from Rybnik
Sportspeople from Silesian Voivodeship
Polish footballers
Association football goalkeepers
Odra Wodzisław Śląski players
Legia Warsaw players
Legia Warsaw II players
Polonia Bytom players
Ruch Chorzów players
Zagłębie Sosnowiec players
Ekstraklasa players
I liga players
III liga players